Camp Edwards Heliport  is a private use heliport located at Camp Edwards, a U.S. Army facility in Barnstable County, Massachusetts, United States. The airport is located three nautical miles (6 km) north of the central business district of Bourne, Massachusetts. It is owned by the Massachusetts Army National Guard.

Facilities and aircraft 
Camp Edwards Heliport has one helipad designated H1 with a concrete surface measuring 117 by 40 feet (36 x 12 m). There are 17 helicopters based at this facility.

See also
List of military installations in Massachusetts

References

External links 
 Aerial image as of March 1995 from USGS The National Map
 

Bourne, Massachusetts
Airports in Barnstable County, Massachusetts
Installations of the U.S. Army in Massachusetts
Military heliports in the United States
United States Army airfields
Heliports in Massachusetts